The following list of Carnegie libraries in Indiana provides detailed information on United States Carnegie libraries in Indiana, where 164 public libraries were built from 156 grants (totaling $2,508,664) awarded by the Carnegie Corporation of New York from 1901 to 1918. In addition, academic libraries were built at 2 institutions (totaling $80,000).

Key

Public libraries

Academic libraries

Notes

References

Note: The above references, while all authoritative, are not entirely mutually consistent. Some details of this list may have been drawn from one of the references (usually Jones) without support from the others.  Reader discretion is advised.

Indiana
Libraries
 
Libraries